Rhopalophora casignata is a species of beetle in the family Cerambycidae. It was described by Martins and Napp in 1989.

References

casignata
Beetles described in 1989